Jólnir was formerly a volcanic island south of Iceland. It was a former vent of Surtsey, along with Syrtlingur and Surtla. It emerged from the ocean as a result of active plate tectonics between December, 1965 and July, 1966.  Oceanic erosion cyclically wore down the new lava as it formed, and the island sank below the surface several times.

It was named for Jólnir, a Norse god (usually identified as a second name for Odin).

Jólnir's formation is closely linked to that of neighboring volcanic island, Surtsey, which emerged in 1963. Volcanic eruptions occurred in much of the surrounding water, but newly formed land was subject to erosion and many small islands washed away. By 1966, Jólnir had broken the surface and a volcanic cone of mafic tephra developed.

After volcanic activity ceased on 8 August 1966, the Atlantic Ocean's waves rapidly eroded the volcanic island. Near the end of September 1966, the island disappeared below the Atlantic Ocean's surface.

See also
 List of volcanoes in Iceland

References

External links 
 Photograph and brief description from United States Armed Forces newspaper Stars and Stripes.
 Another photograph of Jólnir in 1966
 University of North Dakota page about Surtsey and Jólnir

Islands of Iceland
Volcanoes of Iceland
Ephemeral islands
Active volcanoes
Vestmannaeyjar
Submarine volcanoes